Chocques is a commune in the Pas-de-Calais department in the Hauts-de-France region of France.

Geography
The A26 autoroute passes by a half-mile away.

Population

Places of interest

 The church of Notre-Dame, dating from the thirteenth century.
 The war memorial.
 The remains of an 11th-century castle.

See also
Communes of the Pas-de-Calais department

References

Communes of Pas-de-Calais